The 2013–14 Houston Baptist Huskies men's basketball team represented Houston Baptist University in the 2013–14 college basketball season. This was head coach Ron Cottrell's twenty-third season at HBU. The Huskies played their home games at the Sharp Gymnasium and were new members of the Southland Conference. They finished the season 6–25, 2–16 in Southland play to finish in last place. They failed to qualify for the Southland Conference tournament.

Media
All Houston Baptist games will be broadcast online live by Legacy Sports Network (LSN). LSN will also provide online video for every non-televised Huskies home game. However HBU games can air on ESPN3 or Comcast SportsNet Houston as part of the Southland Conference TV packages.

Roster

Schedule and results

|-
!colspan=12 style="background:#002366; color:#FF7F00;"|Non-Conference Schedule

|-
!colspan=12 style="background:#002366; color:#FF7F00;"|Conference Schedule

References

Houston Christian Huskies men's basketball seasons
Houston Baptist
Houston Baptist Huskies basketball
Houston Baptist Huskies basketball